The Northern Districts women's cricket team, previously known as Northern Spirit, is the women's representative cricket team of the Northern Districts Cricket Association, based in the northern half of New Zealand's North Island. They play their home games at Seddon Park, Hamilton. They compete in the Hallyburton Johnstone Shield one-day competition and also the Women's Super Smash Twenty20 competition, where they are known as the Northern Brave.

History
Northern Districts joined the New Zealand women's domestic structure in 1999–00, finishing bottom of the Hallyburton Johnstone Shield in their first year of competing. Northern Districts have consistently been one of the poorest performers in both the Hallyburton Johnstone Shield and the Twenty20 Super Smash, which began in 2007–08, and are the only current side to have not won a trophy. 

Northern Districts' best finish in the Super Smash came in its inaugural season, when they finished 3rd with 3 wins. In 2019–20, they reached the final of the Hallyburton Johnstone Shield, but lost by 67 runs to Auckland, despite batter Felicity Leydon-Davis scoring 124. Northern Districts' Caitlin Gurrey was the leading run-scorer across the whole tournament, with 576 runs. In 2020–21, the side finished 4th in both competitions, with 5 wins in the Shield and 3 in the Super Smash.

On 9 October 2021, it was announced that the Northern Districts Cricket Association were combining the brands of the men's and women's teams for the Super Smash, with both teams becoming known as Northern Brave.

Grounds
Northern Districts' first match was played at St Paul's Collegiate Ground. Their primary ground soon became Westpac Trust Park, Hamilton, as well as using Wintech Park in the same city.

From 2005, Northern Districts began using Blake Park, Mount Maunganui (later Bay Oval) as their main home ground, as well as later using Cobham Oval, Whangarei and returning to Westpac Trust Park, now renamed Seddon Park. The side has also occasionally used St Peter's School, Cambridge, as well as returning to St Paul's Collegiate Ground. In 2021–22 and 2022–23, they played the majority of their home games at Seddon Park, as well as playing at Bay Oval and at Cobham Oval.

Players

Current squad
Based on squad for the 2022–23 season. Players in bold have international caps.

Notable players
Players who have played for Northern Districts and played internationally are listed below, in order of first international appearance (given in brackets): 

 Emily Drumm (1992)
 Catherine O'Neill (1993)
 Caitriona Beggs (1995)
 Charlotte Edwards (1996)
 Katie Pulford (1999)
 Donna Trow (1999)
 Kari Carswell (2001)
 Mandie Godliman (2002)
 Nicola Browne (2002)
 Louise Milliken (2002)
 Eimear Richardson (2005)
 Ros Kember (2006)
 Elyse Villani (2009)
 Morna Nielsen (2010)
 Natalie Dodd (2010)
 Kelly Anderson (2011)
 Kerry-Anne Tomlinson (2011)
 Anna Peterson (2012)
 Holly Ferling (2013)
 Samantha Curtis (2014)
 Holly Huddleston (2014)
 Hayley Jensen (2014)
 Felicity Leydon-Davis (2014)
 Bernadine Bezuidenhout (2014)
 Beth Mooney (2016)
 Naomi Stalenberg (2016)
 Amanda-Jade Wellington (2016)
 Ashleigh Gardner (2017)
 Katie McGill (2018)
 Neisha Pratt (2018)
 Caitlin Gurrey (2019)
 Marina Lamplough (2019)
 Regina Lili'i (2019)
 Lily Mulivai (2019)
 Brooke Halliday (2021)

Olympian Emma Twigg has also represented the team, fielding as the twelfth man in Northern Districts' final match of the 2021–22 Super Smash.

Coaching staff

Head Coach: Joanna Broadbent

Honours
 Hallyburton Johnstone Shield:
 Winners (0):
 Best finish: Runners-up (2019–20)
 Women's Super Smash:
 Winners (0):
 Best finish: 3rd (2007–08)

See also
 Northern Districts men's cricket team

Notes

References

Women's cricket teams in New Zealand
Cricket in Northern Districts
Super Smash (cricket)